The Jump River is a tributary of the Chippewa River in northern Wisconsin.

Jump River may also refer to:

Jump River (town), Wisconsin, in Taylor County
Jump River (community), Wisconsin, an unincorporated community located in the town, on the banks of the Jump River

See also 
 Jump (disambiguation)